Byerazino District is a second-level administrative district of Minsk Region, Belarus. The capital of the town is Byerazino.

Notable residents 
 Mikola Ravienski (1886 - 1953), Belarusian composer, conductor and music critic, author of the music for the hymn Mahutny Boža (Almighty God)
 Walenty Wańkowicz (1799. Kałużyce estate (now village)- 1842), painter

References

External links

 
Districts of Minsk Region